KF Dardana is a professional football club from Kosovo which competes in the First League. The club is based in Kamenicë. Their home ground is the Agush Isufi Stadium which has a seating capacity of 1,000.

See also
 List of football clubs in Kosovo

References

Football clubs in Kosovo
Association football clubs established in 1991
Kamenica, Kosovo